Bax inhibitor 1 is a protein that in humans is encoded by the TMBIM6 gene.

References

Further reading